Jonas Björkman and Todd Woodbridge were the defending champions and won in the final 6–3, 3–6, [10–7] against Paul Haarhuis and Yevgeny Kafelnikov.

Seeds

Draw

Finals

Top half

Bottom half

External links
 2002 Monte Carlo Masters Doubles Draw

2002 Monte Carlo Masters
Doubles